Jonathan Dubasin (born 2 February 2000) is a Belgian footballer who plays as a left winger for Spanish club Albacete Balompié.

Club career
Born in La Seu d'Urgell, Lleida, Catalonia to Belgian parents from Namur, Dubasin joined Girona FC's youth setup in March 2018, after representing Club Atlètic Segre and FC Andorra. On 18 July 2019, after finishing his formation, he was loaned to Tercera División side UE Figueres for the season.

On 7 October 2020, Dubasin moved to Segunda División B side UE Llagostera on loan for one year. The following 3 August, he joined UD Logroñés in Primera División RFEF, also in a temporary deal.

On 19 July 2022, Dubasin signed a three-year contract with Albacete Balompié, newly-promoted to Segunda División. He made his professional debut on 15 August, coming on as a second-half substitute for Rubén Martínez in a 2–1 away win against CD Lugo.

International career
On 6 February 2019, Dubasin was called up to the Belgium under-19 team for two friendlies. He made his international debut on 1 March, in a friendly against FCV Dender.

References

External links

2000 births
Living people
People from Alt Urgell
Sportspeople from the Province of Lleida
Belgian footballers
Spanish footballers
Belgian people of Spanish descent
Spanish people of Belgian descent
Footballers from Catalonia
Association football wingers
Segunda División players
Primera Federación players
Segunda División B players
Tercera División players
Girona FC players
UE Figueres footballers
UE Costa Brava players
UD Logroñés players
Albacete Balompié players